The following is a list of county roads in Lafayette County, Florida.  All county roads are maintained by the county in which they reside, although not all routes are marked with standard county road shields.

County roads in Lafayette County

References

FDOT Map of Lafayette County
FDOT GIS data, accessed January 2014

 
County